The Story of God is a three-part video series produced by Dangerous Films featuring the physician Professor Lord Winston. It first aired on 4, 11 and 18 December 2005 on BBC One. It was rebroadcast by the Canadian Broadcasting Corporation in May and June 2006 and by the Australian Broadcasting Corporation in April 2007.

The Story of God series explores the origins of religion. The documentary focuses on the three Abrahamic faiths, and discusses belief in God in a scientific age.  The series included a number of interviews with scientists including Dean Hamer, Richard Dawkins, and members of the CERN programme.

During the documentary Winston debates notable creationist Ken Ham, visiting the creation museum where, he claims, "scientific facts are ignored in favour of religious certainty." He presents his view that science and religion have an important role in human development, but absolute certainty in either, 'can lead to serious problems'.

Winston also wrote a book titled The Story of God which was published in 2005.

Episodes 
 "Life, the Universe and Everything"
 The first episode focusses on the origins of ancient animistic beliefs and the eastern religions of Hinduism, Buddhism and Zoroastrianism.
 "No god but God"
 The second episode focusses on the three monotheistic Abrahamic faiths: Judaism, Christianity and Islam.
 "God of the Gaps"
 The third episode considers how the idea of God has been challenged by modern ideas, especially scientific theories and discoveries.

References

External links 
Video clips
The Story of God – Zoroastrianism, video clip
Discussion
Press Release for The Story of God, BBC ONE Factual & Arts TV, 9 September 2005
When science meets God, Robert Winston, BBC News, Friday, 2 December 2005. 
The Story of God, with Robert Winston, BBC1 Television., David Couchman, facingthechallenge.org, no date listed.
Why do we believe in God?, Robert Winston, The Guardian, Thursday 13 October 2005

Reviews
Review of The Story of God, Tony Watkins, Damaris Trust, 2005.  
The Story of God—an overview, Paul Taylor, AiG–UK, Answers in Genesis website, 21 December 2005.
The Story of God—a review of part one of the new BBC–TV series on the evolution of religion, Paul Taylor, AiG–UK, Answers in Genesis website, 12 December 2005 

BBC television documentaries
Religion and science
Documentary films about religion